Alexander Halley Wann (born 20 December 1940) is a Scottish footballer, who played as a wing half in the Football League.

References

External links

1940 births
Living people
Scottish footballers
Manchester City F.C. players
St Mirren F.C. players
Oldham Athletic A.F.C. players
Forfar Athletic F.C. players
Northwich Victoria F.C. players
English Football League players
Association football wing halves
Luncarty F.C. players
Footballers from Perth and Kinross